Perpetual war, endless war, or a forever war, is a lasting state of war with no clear conditions that would lead to its conclusion. These wars are situations of ongoing tension that may escalate at any moment, similar to the Cold War. From the late 20th century, the concepts have been used to critique the United States Armed Forces interventions in foreign nations and the military–industrial complex such as the Vietnam War and the Soviet-Afghan War, or wars with ambiguous enemies such as the war on terror or war on drugs.

Causes 
Poor military planning is one of the major reasons that a forever war can occur. If the territory gained in a war is not occupied or controlled properly, this can allow a deadly insurgency to occur, potentially stretching out a conflict that never ends. Similarly, warfare that is fought irregularly, such as rebellions in Africa, do not have a set of military objectives in mind, usually because these rebel groups intend to commit war crimes against the civilian population. Thus, the lack of actual military goals can in itself be a reason that a forever war can occur.  A very large defense budget may also be a factor in the transpiration of a forever war. This allows a country to fight several forever wars. , the United States has a high military budget that is larger than their budget for World War II, allowing for inflation, which enables them to fight wars forever in Iraq and other countries. The idea of a forever war can also extend to civil wars. Simply, civil wars can last for a prolonged period of time whenever a military stalemate occurs between both sides.

A lack of democracy in a country can lead to a forever war, as this makes a country more likely to become engulfed in a civil war. Politically, forever wars can occur in order to keep money flowing into institutions, such as the military–industrial–congressional complex (MICC). Thus, forever wars can serve as domestic political engines. The continuous changes in capitalism in globalized markets influences policy makers. This, in turn, causes the policy makers to promote policies of continuing and expanding wars. As well, forever wars can be used by small armed groups in an attempt to wear down a larger group or country. For example, in the aftermath of the 9/11 attacks and the beginning of the war on terror, Al-Qaeda attempted to get the United States involved in a prolonged guerrilla war in Afghanistan, or in other words a forever war. The reason for this was to destroy American will to fight such a long war, and ultimately force the United States to not only withdraw from Afghanistan, but from the Middle East as well. Thus, forever wars can be started in an attempt to achieve political goals for armed groups.

Wars between ethnic or ideological groups can become forever wars, as such wars are harder to end with a negotiated peace deal due to the different interests of the two sides. Religious wars may also make it harder since it is often prophesized divinely on both sides that the other must be destroyed.  

Perpetual war can also stem from financial support for a rebellion or country, such as rebel groups selling illegal products or taxing civilians on one side of the conflict. The financial assistance allows rebellion groups to be able to fight longer with more supplies.

In current events

The concept of a perpetual war has been used since opposition to United States involvement in the Vietnam War. James Pinckney Harrison argues in The Endless War: Fifty Years of Struggle in Vietnam (1981) that the Vietnam War was "endless" due to the success of the communist revolution in nationalizing the people. The concept was used by Trần Văn Đôn, a general in the Army of the Republic of Vietnam, in his book Our Endless War: Inside Vietnam (1978).

American historian James Chace argues in his book Endless War: How we got involved in Central America (1983) that US policy in Central America is based upon the assumption that US hegemony is threatened within the region. According to Chace, US involvement in Central America worked towards resisting the domino effect of the spread of a "communist take-over", largely through establishing the credibility of US military. Though these policies were meant to deter conflict, they themselves created the conditions for instability in the region, which furthered a US response. This resulted in a self-perpetuating, or "endless", loop. He additionally argues US investment in pursuing an expanding military presence in Central America reflects an endless preparation for war.

A key argument of Chace is that much this military involvement stems from a logic of US paranoia in reaction to the Cuban Revolution. A similar argument is put forward by David Keen, political economist and Professor of Complex Emergencies at the London School of Economics. His book Endless War? Hidden Function of the 'War on Terror''' (2006) argues that the United States' strategies and tactics in the war on terror use a "militaristic state-cased framework". This framework, though "counterproductive", has an "inner logic" and a "psychological function" of responding to the trauma of September 11 attacks.

Noam Chomsky posits that a state of perpetual war is an aid to (and is promoted by) the powerful members of dominant political and economic classes, helping maintain their positions of economic and political superiority.

British journalist Robert Fisk, a critic of Western policies in the Middle East, argues that recent Western conflicts against the Middle East, after the end of the Cold War, have been part of a new perpetual war. He suggests that former U.S. President George H. W. Bush launched attacks on Iraq, Sudan, and Afghanistan to distract the population from his domestic political problems. In addition, he claims that despite victorious claims after the first Gulf War that Saddam Hussein had been "defanged", he was again the target of Western attacks until his execution in 2006.

Similarly, Ted Koppel described the war on terror as "Our Children's Children's War". Critics of Western policies have used the term "perpetual war" in reference to non-military "wars", such as the "War on Drugs", "War on Poverty", "War on Cancer", Lou Dobbs's "War on the Middle Class", the "War on Terrorism", the "War on Women", or Bill O'Reilly's "War on Christmas".

In socioeconomics and politics
The economic make-up of the 5th century BC Athens-led Delian League also bears resemblance to the economic ramifications of preparing for perpetual war.  Aspects of any given empire, such as the British Empire and its relation to its domestic businesses that were owned by a wealthy minority of individuals, such as the East India Company, the Hudson's Bay Company, and De Beers, manifest an observed relationship between a minority of individuals influencing Empire or State policy, such as the Child's War in India, the Anglo-Mysore Wars in India, the Anglo-French conflicts on Hudson Bay in Canada, and the Second Boer War in South Africa, follow a pattern where the Empire allocates resources pursuing and sustaining policies that financially profit the Empire's domestic business's owners.

 Military–industrial complex 

The concept of a military–industrial complex was first suggested by U.S. President Dwight D. Eisenhower and the idea that military action can be seen as a form of market-creation goes back at least as far as speeches beginning in 1930 prior to the publication of War Is a Racket in 1935. On January 16, 1961, President Eisenhower delivered his farewell speech expressing great concern for the direction of the newfound armaments industry post-WWII. While recognizing the boom in economic growth after the war, he reminded the people of United States that this was a way of profiting off warfare and that if not regulated enough it could lead to the "grave" expansion of the armaments industry. For his warning of the thirst to profit from warfare through weapon production, Eisenhower coined the term "military industrial complex". He said, "The potential for the disastrous rise of misplaced power exists and will persist." Eisenhower feared that the military–industrial complex could lead to a state of perpetual war as the big armament industry will continue to profit from warfare. Additionally, NSC 68 can be used as a reference to understand U.S. President Harry S. Truman's reasoning for the continued build up the United States' nuclear arsenal and how this contributed to the Cold War. This concept is still present in today's policies as William D. Hartung states in his article "The Doctrine of Armed Exceptionalism".

 Cold War 

The Cold War was a time of extreme tensions between the Soviet Union's interest of expansion of Communism and the NATO countries which operated on a dominantly capitalist economy. The Soviet Union was viewed as a threat to the American national government as well as its citizens. When the Soviet military reached Afghanistan, the United States took action in training the people of the Middle Eastern nations to combat the Soviet Army. During the Soviet–Afghan War under the Carter administration, the CIA gave a lot of aid and training to the Islamic Jihadists and helped fund Wahhabi Universities in Afghanistan, Pakistan as well as Iraq. In 1979, Osama Bin Laden was assigned to the CIA and received U.S. military training. In 1985, President Reagan met with Islamic Jihadists at the White House. Under Reagan's presidency, these Islamic Jihadists were known as "freedom fighters", but were later relabeled as "Islamic terrorists" under President George W. Bush's administration. It should also be noted that non-Jihadist Islamist resistance fighters were also aided by the CIA during the Soviet-Afghan War, and these groups became the Northern Alliance, but since the support was funnelled through Pakistan's ISI, Massoud received less support than the more radical factions.

 War on terror 

Traditionally, the term "war" referred to the physical and conventional act of engaging in armed conflict. However, the implications of what war entails has evolved over time. The war on terror has often been cited as a perpetual war, being a war with "no specific battlefield and the enemy isn’t an army." The war on terror has been directed at countless "enemies," as it has no clear target. Georgetown University Historian Bruce Hoffman describes traditional war as a war that "ends with the vanquishing of an opponent, with some form or armistice or truce- some kind of surrender instrument or document." In contrast, the war on terror continues with no end in sight.

The war on terror was declared in 2001 by President George W. Bush, following the September 11 attacks, but as early as 1996, Osama bin Laden of Al-Qaeda made a threat to the United States, by making a declaration of war. The growing tensions of the Middle East are suggested by Laurence Andrew Dobrot to be very wide cultural misunderstandings and faults the West for not making peace with the Middle East. As the deputy director for the Missile Defense Agency's Airborne Laser Program, Dobrot examines the hostility which has been continuous not only since 2001, but since the birth of Wahhabism.

Dobrot proposed that the U.S should recognize the cultural hostility of the tribal Arabs in order to make the first steps towards progression of making peace.

The Crusades arose as European expansion was growing at the peak of unified Islamic dominance. On September 16, 2001, in a speech, President Bush referred to the war on terror as a crusade. He said:

 No one could have conceivably imagined suicide bombers burrowing into our society and then emerging all in the same day to fly their aircraft - fly U.S. aircraft into buildings full of innocent people - and show no remorse.  This is a new kind of  -- a new kind of evil.  And we understand.  And the American people are beginning to understand.  This crusade, this war on terrorism is going to take a while.  And the American people must be patient.  I'm going to be patient.

Andrew Bacevich described Bush's naming of the war on terror as a crusade as something which does not make the war separate, rather something that shows that it is part of an "eternal war."

 War on drugs 

The 1960s gave birth to a rebellious movement that popularized drug use. "Hippies" sought to expand their minds with the use of hallucinogens like LSD, whilst many soldiers returned from the Vietnam War with heroin habits. Demand for drugs skyrocketed in the 1960s.

The War on drugs was declared by President Nixon in June 1971. It was later picked up by the Reagan administration as First Lady Nancy Reagan spread the message with her slogan "Just Say No" to drugs. Though coined by Ronald Reagan, the policies which his administration implemented existed stretching back to Woodrow Wilson's presidency. Security measures were taken under Reagan to restrict drugs. The Comprehensive Drug Abuse Prevention and Control Act of 1970 was passed so that pharmaceutical companies may keep track of the distributions and maintain restrictions on certain types of drugs. In 1988 the Office of National Drug Control Policy was set to pass more regulations and restrictions on drug policies, though the media labeled the agency directors as "drug czars." The average annual funding for eradication and interdiction programs increased from $437 million during Carter's presidency to $1.4 billion during Reagan's first term. Under George Bush's administration, a significant increase of actions were taken toward the war on drugs, including militant force, student drug testing, and drug raids.

The war on drugs received criticism from political figures, such as President Barack Obama and Pat Robertson. Robertson said that the war on drugs must come to an end as there is a mass incarceration of drug users, who did not commit any violent acts, serving time. He says, "We here in America make up 5 percent of the world's population, but we make up 25 percent of jailed prisoners", in reference to the war on drugs.

 War memorials 

With the advent of perpetual war, communities have begun to construct war memorials with names of the dead while the wars are ongoing. The Northwood Gratitude and Honor Memorial in Irvine, California was dedicated in 2010 to American troops who lost their lives in the wars in Iraq and Afghanistan, with space for 8,000 names (approximately 4,500 used at time of construction) and the intention to update it yearly.

Views of influential writers

 Thomas Hobbes 

Political Philosopher Thomas Hobbes succinctly wrote in 1651 that a hypothetical state of nature was a condition of perpetual war.  The following quotation from chapter 13 of his book Leviathan explores the causes and effects of perpetual war:

Sun Tzu

Ancient war advisor Sun Tzu expressed views in the 6th century BC about perpetual war.  The following quotation from chapter 2, Waging War, of his book The Art of War suggests the negative impacts of prolonged war:

Alexis de Tocqueville

Historian Alexis de Tocqueville made predictions in 1840 concerning perpetual war in democratic countries.  The following is from Volume 2, chapter 22, "Why Democratic Nations Naturally Desire Peace and Democratic Armies, War", 18th paragraph, in his book, Democracy in America:

 Relationship with the democratic republic 
The development of a relationship network between people who wield political and economic power as well as those who own capital in companies that financially profit from warfare have a relationship to records influencing public opinion of war through the influence of mass media outlets. These may also include the presentation for the causes of war, the effects of war, and the Censorship of war. The following authors, have suggested that entering a state of perpetual war becomes progressively easier in a modern democratic republic, such as the United States:
 The Iron Triangle: Inside the Secret World of the Carlyle Group (2004), by Dan Briody. 
 The Pentagon Labyrinth: 10 Short Essays to Help You Through It (2011)  an anthology by nine authors who are Pierre M. Sprey, George Wilson, Franklin C. Spinney, Bruce I. Gudmundsson, Col. G. I. Wilson, Col. Chet Richards, Andrew Cockburn, Thomas Christie, and Winslow T. Wheeler.
 Prophets of War: Lockheed Martin and the Making of the Military-Industrial Complex (2010), by William D. Hartung. 
 Media Control, Second Edition: The Spectacular Achievements of Propaganda (2002), by Noam Chomsky.
 Manufacturing Consent: The Political Economy of the Mass Media (2002), by Edward S. Herman and Noam Chomsky.  The hypothesized relationship of networking between people wielding such power is known as the military–industrial complex and was briefly described by President Dwight D. Eisenhower on 17 January 1961.

Fiction

 In George Orwell's novel Nineteen Eighty-Four, the three superstates of the world, Eurasia, Oceania and Eastasia, are said to be in a perpetual state of war with each other. The attacks are in the form of rocket attacks (similar to the V2 Attacks on London in WW2) although it is implied in the book that the attacks could be launched by the home Government against their own people in order to perpetuate fear and hatred of the enemy. Therefore, perpetual war may in fact secretly be a strategy used by the state to continuously promote its own political agenda. However, the military attacks are limited to the non-aligned areas (North and Central Africa, India etc.), an example of this is The Malabar Front (India) where Oceania won a victory against Eurasia.
 In the Doctor Who series Genesis of the Daleks, the Kaleds and the Thals are in a perpetual state of war and have been for 1000 years.  This state of war finally results in both sides occupying one city each on either side of mountains, and leads to both sides supplies being so completely ravaged by the war that both sides have a collection of black powder weapons, modern and futuristic weapons and armour.  It is out of this war that the Daleks are created by Davros.
 Also in the Doctor Who series, the Sontarans and the Rutans have been in a perpetual state of war for over 50,000 years. There appears to be no end in sight, with each side continually attempting to completely obliterate the other. This has resulted in either side constantly gaining and losing territory (including the Milky Way galaxy, which is known in Doctor Who as the "Mutter's Spiral").
 And again in Doctor Who in Destiny of the Daleks, the Daleks and the Movellans have basically been drawn into an Endless War, due to their battle computers basically giving a logical set of orders only to have them countered by the other Battle computer with an equally logical set of orders.  As both sides are using logical instructions neither side could win as both sides would be able to counter the advances of the other as both were using logic.  The Daleks returned to Skaro to find Davros to see if he could give them an advantage.  The Movellans tried to get the Doctor to give them the same advantage.
 In the 2000AD series Rogue Trooper, the North (Norts) and South (Southers) of the Planet Nu-Earth, for hundreds of years, have been in a perpetual state of war against each other using conventional, biological, chemical, and nuclear weapons. The length of the war as well as the weapons involved have turned the planet uninhabitable without protective suits. It was for this reason that the Southers created the GIs or Genetic Infantry which would be able to survive in the environment.
 Joe Haldeman's The Forever War is about a war that is made perpetual due to the Einsteinian time dilation effects due to space travel. The novel is said to have been shaped by Haldeman's experience in the Vietnam War as the book contains references to the war paired up with sci-fi concepts. A quote by Haldeman shows great influence from Hobbes' concept of perpetual war, "Life begins in a bloody mess and sometimes it ends the same way, and only odd people seek out blood between those times, maybe crazy people."
 In the original Star Trek episode "A Taste of Armageddon", the neighboring planets of Eminiar and Vendikar have been at war for 500 years. To avoid the physical devastation of an actual war, the belligerents agreed to conduct only computer-simulated attacks as long as the resulting "victims" voluntarily kill themselves in "disintegration stations".
 The 2006 film Children of Men displays themes of perpetual war by exploring the wars on Terror and Poverty. The movie is set in a dystopia suffering universal infertility. The social and political world has become chaotic as few people exercise social power from their wealthy positions. Meanwhile, there is constant conflict all around the world, which specifically the oppressed group suffers. Manohla Dargis of The New York Times takes notice to the norm of bombs casually exploding in public places, such as a cafe. Dargis writes, "It imagines the unthinkable: What if instead of containing Iraq, the world has become Iraq, a universal battleground of military control, security zones, refugee camps and warring tribal identities?"
 The 2013 science fiction film Snowpiercer illustrates tensions between socioeconomic classes, environmentalism, and usage of militarism. The Earth is rendered uninhabitable due to human destruction and carelessness. What remains of humanity must live in a self-sustaining biosphere on a train ruled by a tyrannical government. The working class are oppressed by the elite. The film displays a strong message on class structure and war between socioeconomic classes.
 The Danganronpa videogame series centers around an ongoing crisis known as "The Biggest, Most Awful, Most Tragic Event in Human History," or just The Tragedy. Originally beginning as a student protest against Hope's Peak Academy, it gradually escalated into an uprising of the poor against the elite, and a state of global social unrest, violence, and warfare happening not for any sort of political or ideological purpose, but just for the sake of causing death and destruction.
 Perpetual war is also associated with Warhammer 40,000 and other Warhammer titles. This concept is seen throughout these universes with the common tagline: "In the grim darkness of the far future, there is only war" and is essential to the "Grimdark" setting.
In 2045, an economic disaster known as Simultaneous Global Default triggered the never-ending economic war, called the "Sustainable War", taking place at the 2020 animated web series Ghost in the Shell: SAC_2045, which was released on Netflix in April 2020.
 In Star Wars: The Clone Wars (2008 TV series), Sheev Palpatine creates a perpetual war, making a Clone Trooper army allied with the Jedi and Senate fight a Battle Droid army allied with the Sith and the Separatists. In reality, Palpatine is the mastermind behind the entire war, since he is in control of the senate and the Sith Lord Count Dooku, the separatist leader.

See also

Arab–Israeli conflict 
Endemic warfare
Just war
List of wars extended by diplomatic irregularity
Permanent war economy
Perpetual peaceThe Report from Iron MountainRogue state
Si vis pacem, para bellum
War as metaphorWar Is a RacketRoman–Persian Wars, noted for being "never-ending" by classical authors

Notes

ReferencesPerpetual War for Perpetual Peace, by Gore Vidal. Nation Books, 2002. Perpetual War for Perpetual Peace'', edited by Harry Elmer Barnes, The Caxton Printers Ltd., 1953 -  Perpetual War for Perpetual Peace

External links
Homeland Security: When The Phoenix Comes Home To Roost, by Douglas Valentine.
The Eternal War Parade, from Intervention Magazine.
The State, by Randolph Bourne – origin of the phrase, "war is the health of the state".
The War on Drugs as the Health of the State, by Bob Black.
The Doctrine of Armed Exceptionalism. by William Hartung.

Cold War
Wars by type
Military doctrines
Public policy
Military operations